Mahooz is a neighborhood of Manama, Bahrain. The grave and shrine of the 13th century Shia theologian Maitham Al Bahrani is located in Mahooz.

Neighborhoods of Manama